Vitaly Gennadyevich Suetov (born 28 April 1971) is a former Russian professional footballer.

Career
Suetov played in the Russian First Division with FC Rubin-TAN Kazan and FC Torpedo Volzhsky.

External links
 

1971 births
Sportspeople from Volgograd
Living people
Soviet footballers
Russian footballers
Association football midfielders
Russian expatriate footballers
Expatriate footballers in Finland
Expatriate footballers in Estonia
FC Rubin Kazan players
FC Energiya Volzhsky players
Atlantis FC players
HIFK Fotboll players
FC Rotor Volgograd players